Ultimate Deception (also known as Ultimate Betrayal) is a 1999 made-for-television drama film directed by Richard A. Colla and starring Yasmine Bleeth and Richard Grieco, who were living together in real life at the time the film was produced.

Plot
Terry Cuff (Yasmine Bleeth) is a bartender who yearns to raise a family. When she marries Bobby Woodkin (Richard Grieco) she finds herself one step closer to her dream. However, Bobby has had a vasectomy, is a con artist and, unbeknownst to Terry, kills young mother Dana McThomas (Sabrina Grdevitch) and steals her 3 month old baby, a girl named Gail (Lauren and Marlee Konikoff), so he and Terry can raise the infant as their own daughter.

Bobby fakes a law firm and lawyer so his plan does not fail and that he and Terry can keep the child, renamed "Angie". Later, Terry discovers what Bobby has done and returns baby Gail to her father, Andy (Gordon Michael Woolvett). Bobby is arrested and sentenced to life in prison for Dana's murder and Gail's kidnapping.

Cast
 Yasmine Bleeth as Terry Cuff
 Richard Grieco as Bobby Woodkin
 Gordon Michael Woolvett as Andy McThomas
 Sabrina Grdevich as Dana Ballard
 Robin Brûlé as Cloë
 Nola Augustson as Elaine McThomas
 Philip Granger as Frank McThomas
 James Millington as Ken Pryor
 David Huband as Stan
 Vince Corazza as Det. Gary Falstorm
 Michael Rhoades as Det. Harry Moore
 Geoffrey Bowes as Hay
 Anthony Sherwood as Granger
 Hrant Alianak as Dr. Amos
 Panou as Bud
 Christina Collins as Ms. Richards
 Stephanie Anne Mills as Sheila the Waitress
 Kevin Jubinville as Benji
 Nancy McAlear as Woman on Phone
 Trent McMullen as Cop
 Ann Marin as Woman at Mall
 Matthew Bennett as Federal Building Guard
 Carole Mackereth as Mother
 Jovanni Sy as Desk Sergeant
 Dan Gallagher as Check Cashier
 Marcia Bennett as Bank Manager
 J.C. Kenny as Reporter
 Lauren and Marlee Konikoff as Gail McThomas/Angela "Angie" Woodkin (uncredited)
 Christopher Segovia as Sonny (uncredited)
 Michael Segovia as Sonny (uncredited)

External links

1999 films
1999 television films
1990s crime drama films
Crime films based on actual events
1990s English-language films
Films about adoption
Films about con artists
USA Network original films
Films directed by Richard A. Colla
Films scored by Dennis McCarthy
1999 drama films